Michael Hill may refer to:

 Michael Hill (bishop), Bishop of Bristol
 Michael Hill (1672–1699), MP in England and Ireland
 Michael Hill (diplomat), administrator of Ascension Island
 Michael Hill (entrepreneur) (born 1938), New Zealand jeweller, entrepreneur and philanthropist 
 Michael Hill Jeweller, the company
 Michael Hill (activist) (born 1951), leader of the League of the South, a separatist organization in the Southern United States
 Michael Hill, leader of the American blues trio, Michael Hill's Blues Mob

Sports
 Michael Hill (tennis) (born 1974), former tennis player winner of 3 ATP doubles titles
 Michael Hill (baseball) (born 1971), general manager of the Miami Marlins
 Michael Hill (cricketer, born 1945) (born 1945), Australian cricketer
 Michael Hill (cricketer, born 1988) (born 1988), Australian cricketer
 Michael Hill (English cricketer) (born 1951), retired English cricketer
 Michael Hill (American football) (born 1989), American football running back

See also
 Michael Hills (disambiguation)
 Mike Hill (disambiguation)
 Mick Hill (disambiguation)